Asota darsania is a moth of the family Erebidae first described by Druce in 1894. It is found in Indonesia.

The wingspan is about 54 mm.

References

Asota (moth)
Moths of Indonesia
Moths described in 1894